Wang Shijie (born 22 January 2004) is a Chinese footballer currently playing as a midfielder for Guangzhou.

Club career
Wang started his career with Jiangsu Suning, before joining the Evergrande Football School.

Style of play
Wang has drawn comparisons to Japanese footballer Shinji Kagawa for their similar physique and style of play.

Career statistics

Club
.

References

2004 births
Living people
Footballers from Fujian
Chinese footballers
Association football midfielders
Chinese Super League players
Jiangsu F.C. players
Guangzhou F.C. players